The Adventures of Mandrin (Italian: Le Avventure di Mandrin)  is a 1952 French-Italian historical adventure film directed by Mario Soldati and starring Raf Vallone, Silvana Pampanini and Jacques Castelot. It was released under a variety of alternative titles including Don Juan's Night of Love in America and The Affair of Madame Pompadour in Britain.

The film's sets were designed by the art director Guido Fiorini. It was shot at the Farnesina Studios of Titanus in Rome. On its release it earned around 194 million lira at the Italian box office.

Synopsis
During the reign of Louis XV of France the smuggler and brigand Louis Mandrin leads defiance of the government's harsh tax-collecting efforts.

Cast
Raf Vallone as Mandrin
Jacques Castelot as Baron de Villemure
Silvana Pampanini as Rosetta
Michèle Philippe as Marquise de Maubricourt
 Roland Armontel as Marchese di Montbricourt
Gualtiero Tumiati as Prince Guido
Vinicio Sofia as Stefano Vernet
Giulio Donnini as Monsieur Pierre
 Alberto Rabagliati as Behisar
 Nietta Zocchi as Dama di compagnia
Michele Malaspina 
 Pina Piovani

References

Bibliography
 Chiti, Roberto & Poppi, Roberto. Dizionario del cinema italiano: Dal 1945 al 1959. Gremese Editore, 1991.
 Kinnard, Roy & Crnkovich, Tony . Italian Sword and Sandal Films, 1908–1990. McFarland, 2017.

External links
 

1952 films
1950s historical adventure films
1950s Italian-language films
Italian historical adventure films
French historical adventure films
Films directed by Mario Soldati
Films scored by Mario Nascimbene
Films set in the 1750s
Films set in France
Biographical films about bandits
Italian black-and-white films
1950s Italian films
1950s French films